Yang Yun (Chinese: 杨运; Pinyin: Yáng Yùn) (born 18 July 1989) is a Chinese footballer who plays for Chinese club Dalian Jinshiwan.

Club career
Yang started his football career in 2009 when he was promoted to Beijing Guoan's first team squad. The following season in an attempt to gain more playing time Yang was loaned to Beijing Guoan's satellite team Beijing Guoan Talent, which would play as a foreign team in Singapore's S.League in 2010. He made his senior debut in a 3–1 away victory against Geylang United on 12 March 2010. He returned to Beijing Guoan in July 2010 and went on to play in the 2010 Chinese Super League. On 18 August, he made his debut for Beijing Guoan, in a 0–0 away draw against Shaanxi Baorong Chanba, coming on as a substitute for Yan Xiangchuang in the 59th minute.
On 27 February 2015, he was loaned to Super League club Liaoning Whowin until 31 December 2015.

Career statistics
Statistics accurate as of match played 31 December 2020.

References

External links
 

1989 births
Living people
Chinese footballers
Footballers from Beijing
Beijing Guoan F.C. players
Liaoning F.C. players
Beijing Sport University F.C. players
China League One players
Chinese Super League players
Singapore Premier League players
Association football defenders